Pia Arke (née Gant) (1958–2007) was a Kalaaleq (Greenlandic Inuit) and Danish visual and performance artist, writer and photographer. She is remembered for her self-portraits and landscape photographs of Kalaallit Nunaat (Greenland), as well as for her paintings, writings which strove to make visible the colonial histories and complex ethnic and cultural relations between Denmark and Greenland. Throughout her artistic-research practice, the artist used the metaphor of her own mixed-heritage (the "mongrel") as an opportunity to engage these historical relationships, as well as address significant questions of Arctic Indigenous identity and representation.

Early life
Arke was born on 1 September 1958 in Ittoqqortoormiit in northeastern Greenland to a Danish father (the telegraphist Jørgen Gant) and a Greenlandic mother (Justine Piparajik Birgitte). She was brought up in the Thule area of northern Greenland and in the southern town of Qaqortoq, but like many children of similar parentage, she never learnt to speak Greenlandic. She lived with her family both in the east and west of Greenland. After initial schooling in Danish-language schools in Greenland, she moved with her family to Denmark when she was 13. In 1987, Arke returned to Copenhagen, Denmark where she attended the Royal Danish Academy of Fine Arts in Copenhagen to study painting under Mogens Møller and Per Bak Jensen, graduating in 1993. That same year, Arke entered the Department of Theory and Communications at the Royal Danish Academy of Fine Arts, Copenhagen. She graduated with an MFA in 1995 with a published thesis titled, Ethno-Aesthetics/Etnoæstetik, an essay that powerfully critiques Western romantic and primitivist stereotyping of "Eskimo" art, foregrounding critical issues of cultural identity and authenticity in art.

Career 
In the late 1980s, Arke began to exhibit her paintings. In 1988, the artist developed her own life-size pin-hole camera (camera obscura) which she hand-built using pine and plywood, to photograph the landscapes of Greenland that she had known as a child. The results were exhibited in her exhibition Imaginary Homelands in 1990. The structure had a small entry-way where the artist would climb in and attach a sheet of film along the back wall. Light from the outside would then stream in through a small hole at the opposite end of the enclosure. The artist would often take advantage of the slow exposure process, (fifteen to thirty minutes) by staying in the box to manipulate the process through the use of her own body which would cast a visible shadow on the finished image.

In his Editors' introduction to Pia Arke. Arctic Hysteria 1997, Iben Mondrup describes how her exhibition was provocatively called "Arctic hysteria", given the controversial irrationality that was said to affect indigenous women. Her exhibitions and accompanying explanations encouraged Denmark to reexamine the colonial history of Greenland. While a number of exhibitions were held during her lifetime, the first major exhibition of her work in Denmark did not take place until after her death with Tupilakosaurus (2010).

Her art and photographs re-examine the places where she lived as a child revealing Denmark's repressive colonization. Tupilakosaurus consists of over 70 photographs, paintings, videos, installations and reports. As a result, Arke is now recognized as one of the Nordic region's most important postcolonial critics and players as a result of the artistic research which she practiced for two decades.

Legacy
Pia Arke died of cancer in May 2007 when she was 48 years old. She was considered to have achieved the goal of getting Denmark to reconsider its role. However, this is still unclear. Her books have been re-issued and a film and exhibition was created in 2010 at the National Museum of Denmark. Her 1995 book "Ethno-Aesthetics" and "Stories from Scoresbysund" (2003) were made available in English, Danish and Greenlandic. The exhibition was then moved to Sweden and Greenland.

Exhibitions

 2019 – 16th Istanbul Biennial: The Seventh Continent, curated by Nicolas Bourriaud, at Pera Museum, Istanbul, Turkey
 2019 – Pia Arke: Wonderland, curated by Katrine Elise Pedersen, at Kunsthall Trondheim, Trondheim, Norway
 2022 – Drøm og fortrængning, curated by Marianne Ager, at Brandts, Odense, Denmark

Published works

References

Further reading

 

1958 births
2007 deaths
Greenlandic artists
Greenlandic women artists
Danish women writers
Danish women photographers
People from Sermersooq
Danish contemporary artists